Mohammad Anwar Hossain (born December 31, 1981, in Munshiganj) is a Bangladeshi cricketer who has played in 3 Tests and one ODI since 2003. In the course of his short Test career he took over the record for the most runs conceded by a bowler (307) without taking a wicket.

References

1981 births
Living people
Bangladesh Test cricketers
Bangladesh One Day International cricketers
Bangladeshi cricketers
Biman Bangladesh Airlines cricketers
Dhaka Division cricketers
People from Munshiganj District